Torkjell Berulfsen (born 20 January 1943) is a Norwegian television personality.

He is the son of the linguist Bjarne Berulfsen. He took his education at the University of Oslo, graduating in the English language. He worked at the University College London from 1967 to 1968, and was later an editor of a Norwegian-English dictionary. He started working for the Norwegian Broadcasting Corporation in 1971, and has presented many television and radio shows. He won Gullruten awards in 2002 and 2007.

References

1943 births
Living people
Norwegian television presenters
NRK people
Norwegian philologists
University of Oslo alumni
People associated with University College London